Paul Farrugia (born 5 February 1967) is a Maltese wrestler. He competed in the men's freestyle 62 kg at the 1988 Summer Olympics.

References

External links
 

1967 births
Living people
Maltese male sport wrestlers
Olympic wrestlers of Malta
Wrestlers at the 1988 Summer Olympics
Place of birth missing (living people)